Marshalltown is a suburb of Johannesburg, South Africa. It is located in Region F of the City of Johannesburg Metropolitan Municipality.

History 
The suburb has its origin as farm land owned by Frederick Bezuidenhout Junior. This small strip of land on the farm Turffontein, was adjacent to South African Republic owned land of Rantjeslaagte which was soon to be proclaimed as the township of Johannesburg on 8 November 1886. The land was purchased by two businessmen, Henry Brown Marshall and his brother-in-law William M'Laren in September 1886. The land would eventually be quickly surveyed with 553 stands and one market square which would later be known as Marshall Square. At the time, the townships name was known as Marshall's Dorp. By 26 November 1887, the townships boundaries were incorporated into Johannesburg. They would establish a brewery on eight stands in Marshalltown but sold it in 1894. The brewery's logo consisted of three castles and would eventually become part of South African Breweries.

References

Johannesburg Region F